Navy Blue Days is a 1925 American film starring Stan Laurel.

Cast
 Stan Laurel as Stan
 Julie Leonard as Grenadine
 Glen Cavender as Pete Vermicelli

See also
 List of American films of 1925
 Stan Laurel filmography

References

External links

1925 films
1925 short films
American silent short films
American black-and-white films
1925 comedy films
Films directed by Joe Rock
Films directed by Scott Pembroke
Silent American comedy films
American comedy short films
1920s American films